Vinall is a surname. Notable people with the surname include:

 Jack Vinall (1910–1997), English footballer
 Jasper Vinall (1590–1624), English cricketer
 Jack Vinall (1920–1991), Australian Australian rules footballer

See also
 Vinal (disambiguation)